Sheikh Abdur Rahman is a Jatiya Party (Ershad) politician and the former member of parliament of Khulna-2 and Bagerhat-2.

Career
Rahman was elected to parliament from Khulna-1 as a Bangladesh Awami League candidate in 1973. He was elected to parliament from Bagerhat-2 as a Jatiya Party candidate in 1986.

References

Jatiya Party politicians
Living people
3rd Jatiya Sangsad members
Year of birth missing (living people)
1st Jatiya Sangsad members